Charlton Rafaela (born 23 July 1977 in Willemstad) is an Antillean sprinter, who specializes in the 100 metres.

Rafaela is a former track and field athlete of the Interamerican University of Puerto Rico in San Germán. He graduated in Physical Education at a secondary level and finished his master's degree in sports training and teaching in physical education.

Rafaela finished sixth in the 4 x 100 metres relay at the 2005 World Championships, together with teammates Geronimo Goeloe, Jairo Duzant and Churandy Martina.

Achievements

References

External links

1977 births
Living people
Dutch Antillean male sprinters
People from Willemstad
Athletes (track and field) at the 1999 Pan American Games
Athletes (track and field) at the 2003 Pan American Games
Athletes (track and field) at the 2007 Pan American Games
Pan American Games competitors for the Netherlands Antilles